Andrés González de Barcia (died 1743) was a Spanish historian and one of the founders of the Royal Spanish Academy.

Works
He published Ensayo cronologico para la historia general de la Florida (Madrid, 1723), and First Historians of the West Indies, issued in sections, and published collectively after his death (3 vols., folio, 1749). He also edited Herrera's Décadas (1725–30); de la Vega, La Florida (1723), Comentarios reales de los Incas (1723); and Torquemada; Gregorio García's Origen de los indios del Nuevo Mundo (1729); Antonio de Solís, Historia de la conquista de México (1732); Alonso de Ercilla, La Araucana (1733). Appearing posthumously are his Fernando de Colón, Historia del Almirante Colón (1749); Hernán Cortés, Cartas de relación (1749); Gonzalo Fernández de Oviedo y Valdés, Sumario de la natural historia de las Indias (1749); Alvar Núñez Cabeza de Vaca, Relación de la jornada que hizo a la Florida con el adelantado Pánfilo de Narvaez (1749); Francisco López de Gómara, Historia de las Indias y de la conquista de México (1749); and Francisco de Xérez, Verdadera relación de la conquista del Perú (1749).

References

Sources

 

1743 deaths
Year of birth missing
18th-century Spanish historians
Members of the Royal Spanish Academy